Penicillium rubidurum is an anamorph, monoverticillate species of fungus in the genus Penicillium.

References

Further reading 
 
 

rubidurum
Fungi described in 1973